was a compilation video album released by the Japanese band The Blue Hearts. The DVD features the original recordings of the band's first two non-live videos, The Blue Hearts and Blue Hearts no Video - Video Clip 1987-1989. The two videos had previously been released on VHS in 1987 and 1990, respectively, but had not yet been released on DVD.

Recording
The original VHS versions of both videos are included on this DVD and neither the images nor the sounds have been edited. It also includes a 10-minute documentary portion that was filmed with only one camera, not allowing for retakes.

Chapter listing

Blue Hearts no Video - Video Clip 1987-1989
 Opening ("Hito ni Yasashiku" and a slideshow)
 "Train-Train"
 "Love Letter"
 "Kiss Shite Hoshii" (anime version)
 "Aozora" (live version recorded on June 10, 1989)
 Ending ("Linda Linda")

The Blue Hearts
 Opening
 "Bakudan ga Okkochiru Toki"
 "No No No"
 "Linda Linda"
 Ending

References

The Blue Hearts video albums
2004 video albums
Music video compilation albums
2004 compilation albums